Nir Barkat (born 19 October 1959) is an Israeli businessman and politician currently serving as the Minister of the Economy. He served as mayor of Jerusalem between the years 2008–2018.

Biography
Nir Barkat was raised in Jerusalem. His father, Zalman, was a professor of physics at the Hebrew University. His great-grandfather came from Russia to Mandatory Palestine in the 1920s, and died in 1924.

Barkat served in the Paratroopers Brigade of the Israel Defense Forces for six years (1977-1983), as well as reserve duty, and reached the rank of Major. Barkat was also wounded in combat in Lebanon.

Barkat holds a BA in computer science from the Hebrew University of Jerusalem. He also studied for a master's degree in business administration at the same institution, but hasn't completed it.

Barkat and his wife Beverly, an artist, have three daughters. The family lives in the Jerusalem neighborhood of Beit HaKerem.

Nir Barkat was named the 43rd most influential Jewish person in 2013.

Business career

High-Tech Ventures
Barkat started his career in the high-tech industry by founding a software company called BRM in 1988, which specialized in antivirus software. Later, the company became an incubator venture firm that invested in several companies such as Check Point and Backweb. He later helped found the social investment company IVN, Israel Venture Network. In 2007, Barkat took part in the Israeli version of Dragons' Den, the venture-capitalist television program, which consists of entrepreneurs pitching their ideas in order to secure investment from business experts.

Private fortune
According to Forbes in 2013, Barkat's net worth is estimated at NIS 450 million (about $122 million), more than the combined value of the next three politicians on the list making him the wealthiest Israeli politician. On October 3, 2021, Barkat's name was included among 565 Israelis whose names were included in the Pandora papers. As mayor, he did not take any salary from the city of Jerusalem.

Political career

Campaign for mayor of Jerusalem

Nir Barkat's entry into politics was gradual, after his exposure to and philanthropic investments in Jerusalem's education system. In 1999, the Barkat family began to explore the educational gaps in Jerusalem through their investment in The Snunit Center for the Advancement of Web Based Learning, a non-profit, non-governmental organization which uses web based resources to improve online education and improve personal and social growth within the Israeli society. Barkat saw this investment as the beginning of his interest in entering into Jerusalem's municipal politics.

Barkat's official entry into politics began in January 2003, when he founded the party Yerushalayim Tatzli'ah ("Jerusalem Will Succeed") and ran in the Jerusalem mayoral race, securing 43% of the vote and losing to Uri Lupoliansky. After his initial loss, Barkat served as head of the opposition on the city council until his election as mayor in 2008. During this period he helped form StartUp Jerusalem, a venture to create jobs in the capital. He briefly led the Jerusalem faction of the Kadima party from 2006 - 2007, then a powerhouse in Israeli politics, but left due to disagreements with the proposal to relinquish portions of Jerusalem.

Mayor of Jerusalem
Barkat ran for a second time in November 2008, this time winning the election with 52% of the vote (his main rival, Meir Porush, won 43%). Barkat was described as a secular politician, contrasting with both Lupoliansky and Porush, who are Haredi. He ran on a platform of increasing tourism, finding solutions to the housing crisis, and opposing the light rail. He also vowed to make city council more approachable and transparent and decried the use of the mayors office a stepping stone to national politics. Controversies during his first term included the firing of city council member Rachel Azaria and his proposal for relinquishing predominantly Arab populated neighborhoods on the outskirts of the city limits. He helped to initiate the city's first international marathon in 2011 and has personally participating in races both in Jerusalem and abroad.

In 2013, he ran for a second term, during which he was endorsed by the Labor Party, and also by a range of prominent Likud activists; he also had the tacit support of Meretz, which withdrew its candidate, Pepe Alalu, in order not to steal votes away from Barkat. His opponent Moshe Lion had backing from Avigdor Lieberman, head of the Yisrael Beiteinu party and Aryeh Deri, head of Shas. Barkat was re-elected with 52% of the vote compared to his main opponent Moshe Lion former head of the Jerusalem Development Authority, who ran as the Likud candidate who garnered 43% of the electorate. Lion has since served as a member of city council and in 2015 joined Barkat's coalition. Following the tense campaign, Barkat was fined NIS 400,000 for improper use of election funds.  Since his election as Mayor, Barkat has served the city for a salary of one shekel a year. Controversies of his second term have included the Formula 1 exhibition, part of the mayor's effort to raise Jerusalem's status as a cultural capital of the world and increase tourism. The Jerusalem Formula One event took place in 2013 and in 2014 but garnered much criticism for street closures which led to school cancellations, over expenditures, and its appropriateness for the city. Other controversies have included planned addition to the light rail, specifically the blue line, which was planned to run down Emek Refaim street. Mayor Barkat also had a long-running feud with Finance Minister Moshe Kahlon over funding which led to city-wide strikes several years in a row. Kahlon argued that Barkat was wasting funding and mismanagement, while Barkat argued that Kahlon was withholding funds for political reasons. The resulting strikes caused garbage to pile up throughout the city and the threat of mass firings of municipal employees.

In December 2015 Barkat joined the Likud party. He previously endorsed Likud leader Benjamin Netanyahu for Prime Minister in the 2013 and 2015 Knesset elections. In March 2018 he announced his intention to run for national politics rather than seek re-election for a third term as mayor.

Since the mid 2000s, Jerusalem has developed into a regional center for tech start-ups, and was named the #1 emerging tech hub by Entrepreneur magazine. Barkat's administration has provided incentives, tax breaks, and grants for companies with employees living in the city. By 2016, over 500 start-ups had been established in Jerusalem, bringing in upwards of $243 million in investment in the first nine months of 2015. "'After the election of [Mayor Nir] Barkat, personal activism strengthened in the city. People felt they had influence, and it really connected with the entrepreneurial character', said Dana Mann, a partner in PICO Ventures, and previously a partner in OurCrowd."

Barkat has come under fire from some women's rights activists. Some women on the Jerusalem City Council have protested illegal modesty signs. Jerusalem city councilwoman Rachel Azaria, who brought the case of gender-segregated buses in Jerusalem to the court's attention, was fired by Barkat. Laura Wharton, a member of Jerusalem City Council, complained about the illegal modesty signs, but claims she was brushed off." Barkat has criticized Women of the Wall for their confrontational efforts to pray at the Kotel.

2015 terrorist attack 
In February 2015, Barkat garnered international attention when he intervened after seeing a Palestinian man trying to stab a Jewish victim. Barkat succeeded in physically subduing the attacker, with the Mayoral security detail coming in immediately afterward and the victim receiving first aid. The Tzahal Square incident prompted responses from figures such as former Israeli ambassador to the United States Michael Oren, who stated that Barkat had "courageously" acted, as well as commentators on Facebook who shared tongue-in-cheek images depicting Barkat as Batman, Neo, and other film characters. In October 2015, he encouraged Israelis to carry guns as a "duty" in light of increased tensions. His comments were criticised by various commentators.

National politics

In March 2018 he announced he would not run for another term in the Municipal Election, and instead will join the Likud Party, to be a member of Knesset in next elections. On 4 December 2018, he ceased serving as mayor.

See also
Politics of Israel

References

External links
 Nir Barkat official campaign page - Hebrew
 Sari Makover-Belikov, 'After Netanyahu - it's my turn', Ynetnews, October 14, 2019

1959 births
Living people
Businesspeople in software
Jerusalem School of Business Administration alumni
Israeli chief executives
20th-century Israeli Jews
21st-century Israeli Jews
Jewish Israeli politicians
Jewish mayors
Likud politicians
Mayors of Jerusalem
Members of the 21st Knesset (2019)
Members of the 22nd Knesset (2019–2020)
Members of the 23rd Knesset (2020–2021)
Members of the 24th Knesset (2021–2022)
Members of the 25th Knesset (2022–)
People named in the Pandora Papers